Bahman Jādhūyah/Jādūyah (also Jādhōē/Jādōē;), or Bahman Jādhawayh (Middle Persian: Vahūman Ĵādaggōw) was an Iranian general of the Sasanians. He is mostly known to have led the Sasanians to victory against the Arabs at the Battle of the Bridge. The Arab Muslims referred to Bahman as Dhul Hājib ("owner of bushy eyebrows"). He had a reputation for being anti-Arab. He is often confused with Mardanshah, another Sasanian general.

Biography 
Nothing is known of his early life, but Bahman Jadhuyih is recorded as an old man by 634. Bahman may have been the son of the Sasanian commander Hormozd Jadhuyih. Bahman is first mentioned in 633, as one of the spokesmen for the Sasanians and a member of the Parsig faction led by Piruz Khosrow. In 633, the Sasanian monarch ordered a Sasanian commander named Andarzaghar who was in charge of protecting the borders of Khorasan to protect the western frontiers from the Arabs who were plundering Iran.

In 633, Andarzaghar, along with Bahman Jadhuyih, made a counter-attack against the army of Khalid ibn al-Walid at Walaja, but were defeated. After the defeat, Bahman fled to Ctesiphon, where he found Yazdegerd sick. However, Bahman was shortly ordered by the latter to make a counter-attack against the Arabs. Bahman, however, disobeyed the child king and sent Jaban to fight the Arabs instead. Jaban, who was sent alone on the western front to confront the Arabs, was defeated at the battle of Ullais.

When the Arabs under Abu Ubaid were making an expedition in the Sawad in 634, Rostam Farrokhzād sent Bahman Jadhuyih and Jalinus against him with a force from the powerful Wuzurgan class, who had units such as war elephants and the Zhayedan. Rostam is known to have told Bahman that: "if Jalinus returns to the like of his defeat, then cut off his head."

During the battle, known as the Battle of the Bridge, the army of Bahman had an advantage: the elephants in his army frightened the Arabs' horses, and which later resulted in the death of Abu Ubaid. The bridge was then broken by an Arab, and around 4,000 Arabs died by drowning and many others were killed by Bahman's forces. Al-Muthanna managed to flee from the bridge and rally 3,000 Arab survivors; however, some of them fled back to Medina. Bahman did not pursue the fleeing Arab army. In 636 during the Battle of al-Qadisiyyah Bahman was killed by Qa’qa ibn Amr in revenge for the death of Abu Ubaid and the others killed at the Battle of the Bridge.

References

Sources 

 

Generals of Yazdegerd III
636 deaths
Year of birth unknown
Place of birth unknown
Military personnel killed in action
6th-century births
7th-century Iranian people
Generals of Boran